(Benzylideneacetone)iron tricarbonyl is the organoiron compound with the formula (CHCH=CHC(O)CH)Fe(CO). It is a reagent for transferring the Fe(CO) unit.  This red-colored compound is commonly abbreviated (bda)Fe(CO).

Structure and bonding
(bda)Fe(CO) is an example of a complex of an η-ketone. It is a piano stool complex. The compound is characterized by IR bands at 2065, 2005, and 1985 cm (cyclohexane solution), the three bands being indicative of the low symmetry of the complex, which is chiral.

Synthesis, reactions, related reagents

It is prepared by the reaction of Fe(CO) with benzylideneacetone.  

(bda)Fe(CO) sometimes reacts with Lewis bases to give adducts without displacement of the bda.  The reagents of the type (bda)Fe(CO)(PR) function as sources of "Fe(CO)(PR)" (R = aryl, etc.).

Other sources of Fe(CO) are Fe(CO) and Fe(CO)(cyclooctene).  The latter is highly reactive and thermally sensitive.  Imine derivatives of cinnamaldehyde, e.g. CHCH=CHC(H)=NCH, also form reactive Fe(CO) adducts, which have been shown to be superior in some ways to (bda)Fe(CO).

References

Further reading

Organoiron compounds
Carbonyl complexes
Iron(0) compounds
Enones